Scott Quigg (born 9 October 1988) is a British former professional boxer who competed from 2007 to 2020. He held the WBA super-bantamweight title from 2013 to 2016, and the British super-bantamweight title from 2011 to 2012.

Personal life
Quigg started his fight career as a child practising Muay Thai boxing at GFC Muay Thai in Bury. After receiving a lot of attention and being tipped as a future champion in the sport, Quigg had one adult fight at professional rules in Muay Thai scoring a win, before taking the decision to change disciplines and focus his talents towards amateur boxing.

Professional career

Super-bantamweight

Early career 
Quigg's professional debut came at the age of 18 on 21 April 2007 with a victory over Gary Shiel at the Jarvis Hotel in Manchester. Throughout the rest of the year he won on four more occasions giving him a record of 5–0 at the end of 2007.  Quigg fought six more times in 2008, winning on each occasion, a run that included a victory over Ghana's tough journeyman Sumaila Badu in just the first round of a four-round contest.  Watching the contest Boxing News reporter Danny Flexen claimed that after watching over 50 live shows he had "never seen a more complete prospect " with less than 10 fights under his belt.

Quigg remained unbeaten with a further five victories on Hatton Promotions bills in 2009. In his last fight of the year on 27 November Quigg met and stopped the former Ukrainian national champion and former European title challenger Yuriy Voronin in the sixth round of an 8-round fight at the Robin Park Centre in Wigan.

In 2010 Quigg defeated journeyman Nikita Lukin in Stoke on 19 February and then went on to meet Andrey Kostin in his home town of Bury on 29 May. The victory over Kostin was particularly notable in that it was the first time a professional contest had been held in the town since the local council banned the sport 13 years previously, lifting the ban only so that Quigg could compete in his home town. Quigg's homecoming didn't last too long as he triumphed with a stoppage over his Russian opponent in just one round and in front of 1200 fans saying after the fight that "this was one of the best days of my life".

Quigg fought a British title eliminator against tough Scotsman Gavin Reid in his next fight on 16 July 2010. The fight at the Bolton Arena resulted in a 9th round stoppage win for Quigg against a man who had previously gone the distance in a challenge for the Scottish national title.

Regional and domestic success
On 25 September 2010 Quigg returned to the Castle Leisure Centre in Bury to compete for the WBA Inter-Continental title against Argentinian boxer Santiago Allione stopping him in the third round. He defended his title on 26 November 2010 at the Reebok Stadium in Bolton on the undercard of Matthew Hatton's European title defence against Roberto Belge. His opponent, the experienced Frenchman Daniel Kodjo Sassou had won the IBF International title in his last fight against Arsen Martirosyan. Quigg managed to put Sassou down in the 7th round before running out a unanimous points winner over 12 rounds.

Quigg defeated Venezuela's Franklin Varela via a 7th round stoppage in his second defence on 23 July 2011, and was ranked fourth in the WBA.

On 22 October 2011 Quigg defeated Jason Booth (36–7, 15 KOs) to win the British Super-Bantamweight title at the Castle Leisure Centre in Bury. After a one-sided contest Booth retired at the end of the seventh round.

On 4 February 2012, Quigg made the first defence of his title, beating the rugged veteran Jamie Arthur (18–5, 4 KOs) in an eighth-round stoppage, despite being put on the canvas in the fourth.

Quigg vs. Munroe I, ll 
On 16 June 2012 at the Velodrome in Manchester, Quigg faced rival English Super-Bantamweight Rendall Munroe (24–2, 10 KOs) for the Interim WBA Super-Bantamweight Title. Munroe was badly cut over the right eye from an accidental head clash in the third round. With the fight having to be stopped, it went to the scorecards resulting in a Technical Draw with neither man getting a win or a loss on their record, bringing a very big domestic clash to an extremely anticlimactic ending.

The rematch of this highly waited showdown against Rendall Munroe (24–2–1, 10 KOs) was made for the undercard of Ricky Hatton's comeback fight at the Manchester Arena on 24 November, the fight took place at a venue which had sold out within 6 hours of tickets being released. Munroe came out strong in the first, winning it clearly with fast punches and a higher work rate.  After the first, however, Quigg upped it and was landing hard to the body with both rights and lefts round after round.  By the sixth Munroe was surely feeling it and it showed as he went down twice. The second time the fight was stopped with no complaints from Munroe. After this fight Quigg was promoted to WBA Regular Champion.

Quigg fought at the Bolton Arena on 29 June 2013 against Brazilian Willian Prado (21–3–1, 14 KOs) at Featherweight in a scheduled 10 round bout. Quigg won the fight in round 3 after 2 minutes and 31 seconds by knockout.

Quigg vs. Salinas, Silva 
It was announced on 17 July that Quigg would fight undefeated Cuban Yoandris Salinas (20–0–1, 13 KOs) for the WBA (Regular) super-bantamweight title. The fight took place at the O2 Arena in London on 5 October 2013. Salinas started strongly, however Quigg stepped up his tempo midway through the bout and took control, giving Salinas a torrid finish to the fight. The fight went full 12 rounds as the scorecards declared it a majority draw. Two of the judges had it 114–114 and the other awarded it to Quigg 115–113. Quigg told Sky Sports that he felt he won the fight by at least 2 rounds.

On 7 November it was announced that Quigg would defend his title against #13 WBO fringe contender Diego Silva (29–2–4, 15 KOs) on 23 November on the undercard of Carl Froch vs. George Groves at the Phones 4U Arena in Manchester, UK. Quigg told Sky Sports "He [Silva] is a big threat. He is a totally different style to Yoandris Salinas. He is very unorthodox, which means you can’t read him. He doesn’t know what he is going to do next." Many believed this he was a downgrade opponent for Quigg. On fight night, Quigg swiftly defended his WBA title against Silva with a second-round knockout. Quigg floored Silva with a thumping right upper cut and sealed it with a right hook. He needed only one minute and 41 seconds of the second round to complete victory and extend his unbeaten professional record to 27 wins in 29 bouts with his 20th knockout.

Quigg vs. Munyai, Jamoye 
Quigg returned to the Phones 4U Arena on 19 April 2014 to defend his world title against South African Tshifhiwa Munyai (24–2–1, 12 KOs). Quigg had been due to take on interim WBA champion Nehomar Cermeno (22–5–1, 13 KOs), but he had to withdraw because of visa problems. Quigg successfully defended his title for the third time with a second-round stoppage of Munyai. Munyai was knocked down with a left hook in the first round before Quigg struck with a right in the second. Quigg showed destructive power to twice floor Munyai before referee Howard Foster intervened with Munyai on the ropes.

On 26 August it was announced that Quigg will be making the fourth defence of his title at the Phones 4u Arena on 13 September against ex world title challenger Stephane Jamoye (26–51 16 KOs). The packed undercard courtesy of Matchroom Boxing included Manchester lightweight Anthony Crolla and Olympic super-heavyweight champion Anthony Joshua. Quigg seemed to size up Jamoye and waited until the closing minutes before unleashing crunching body shots that sent Jamoye into reverse. In round 3, three stiff punches forced Jamoye to retreat to the ropes and a huge body shot then sent him to the canvas, although Jamoye got back to his feet, referee Terry O'Connor stopped the fight. With this win Quigg was still on course for a super-bantamweight showdown with Carl Frampton, who took the IBF belt from Kiko Martinez the weekend earlier. Quigg also called out WBC champion Leo Santa Cruz.

Quigg vs. Otake, Martínez 
Quigg made his fifth title defence against Hidenori Othake (22–1, 9 KOs) at the sold out Echo Arena in Liverpool on the undercard of Cleverly v Bellew II on 22 November 2014 live on Sky Sports Box Office. Otake was looking make history, bidding to become the first Japanese boxer to win a world title in the UK. This would only be the second time in boxing history that a Japanese boxer has come to England to challenge for the World title, the first was Mitsunori Seki, who was stopped in nine rounds by Howard Winstone in 1968 for the vacant WBC featherweight crown. Despite sustaining a large cut to the right eyebrow, Otake was able to take the bout to the full 12 rounds. The judges scored it (119–109 119–109 118–110) all in favour of Quigg.

It was announced that Quigg would be making a sixth defence of his WBA world title by taking on experienced Spaniard Kiko Martinez (32–5, 24 KOs) on 18 July at the Manchester Arena. Martinez had recently lost the IBF crown to Frampton last September. Quigg struggled in the first round but floored Martinez in the second with a fierce uppercut and followed up with a further barrage until referee Terry O'Connor intervened, retaining his world title in the process.

Quigg vs. Frampton 
Five years in the making, Quigg and Carl Frampton (21–0, 14 KOs) finally faced off on 27 February 2016 at the Manchester Arena in a super bantamweight title unification match. WBA (Super) champion Guillermo Rigondeaux had been downgraded to "champion in recess", with the newly vacated Super title being on the line along with Frampton's IBF world title. It was officially confirmed in November 2015. The fight went full 12 rounds, in front of 20,000 fans, as Quigg suffered his first professional loss, via split decision. Frampton was in full control of the first half of the fight, during which Quigg simply could not find his range. Quigg finally came alive in the last half as the contest turned into a desperate tussle, but Frampton gave as good as he got. Levi Martinez scored it 115–113 for Quigg, while Carlos Sucre and Dave Parris scored it 116–112 in Frampton's favour. This was Quigg's first defeat in 34 professional fights, stretching back to 2007. Although there was no rematch clause in the contract, there was a verbal agreement that they would do it all again in Belfast if the first fight warranted it.

After the fight, Frampton claimed Quigg has little chance of a rematch because their fight was boring and Quigg was so negative in dropping a split decision. Instead stating he would like to move up to featherweight and challenge Leo Santa Cruz in the US. A month later, Frampton was stripped of the WBA (Super) super-bantamweight title after failing to negotiate a first defence against "champion in recess" Guillermo Rigondeaux. Quigg had to undergo surgery after suffering a broken jaw during the fight.

Featherweight 
After recovering from the jaw injury he sustained against Frampton, Quigg announced, like Frampton, he would be moving up to the featherweight division, where he would also pursue a rematch at some point in the future. His trainer Joe Gallagher confirmed Quigg would return to the ring on 10 December 2016 on the undercard of Anthony Joshua vs. Éric Molina. Although an opponent was yet to be announced, Quigg said he wanted to fight the big names of the division.

On 24 November 2016, Mexican boxer Jose Cayetano (20–4, 9 KOs) was confirmed as Quigg's opponent at the Manchester Arena on 10 December. The fight would also be for the WBA International Featherweight title. Cayetano made weight at second attempt. Quigg stopped Cayetano in the 9th round in his debut at featherweight, dropping Cayetano with a right hand to the head in the 9th. Terry O’Connor stopped the fight immediately, as Cayetano was too hurt to get up and resume fighting. The official time of the stoppage was at 1:23 of round 9.

On 20 February 2017, Quigg announced that he had parted ways with long time trainer Joe Gallagher. He confirmed he would be travelling to the United States to train with hall of famer Freddie Roach at the Wild Card gym in Los Angeles. "I have moved up to featherweight with the goal of becoming a two-weight world champion. I need a fresh challenge to help me grow," Quigg said. Quigg had been training with Gallagher for six years.

Quigg against 35-year-old Romanian boxer Viorel Simion (21–1, 9 KOs) was the first bout added to the undercard of the mega fight between Klitschko vs. Joshua at Wembley Stadium in London on 29 April 2017. Simion was known to the British public for his losing effort to Lee Selby in 2013. A week before the fight, IBF revealed the fight would be a final eliminator for their world title. At the time of the fight, Quigg was ranked number 6 by the IBF. Roach claimed that Quigg 'works harder than Pacquiao', stating, "His work ethic is great and we've seen a lot of really good changes already in the gym." Quigg also said that he felt like a "a different fighter". Quigg became a step closer to fighting for the IBF featherweight title when he was taken the distance but won by comfortable margins. Two judges scored the fight 117–111 and 117–111 whilst the third judge scored it closer 115–113 all in favour of Quigg. Simion started off well winning the first couple of rounds. Over the next 8 rounds, Quigg took over landing the better shots. Simion landed clean shots, non-of which did any damage to Quigg. His best moment came in round 7,. when he landed a right hand to Simion's head, which backed him up. Quigg admitted the fight was tough. "It was hard work, but I was in control at all the times. First fight with Freddie, and I'm very happy."

Sky Sports revealed on 25 September 2017, Matchroom Sport would be holding a card at the Casino e Monte Carlo Salle Medecin in Monte Carlo, Monaco on 4 November. Eddie Hearn confirmed Quigg would fight on the under-card in a WBA world title eliminator against 36-year-old Ukrainian contender Oleg Yefimovych (29–2–1, 16 KOs). Yefimovych was coming into this fight on a 12-fight win streak, stretching back to 2011. Freddie Roach did not work in Quigg's corner for the fight. Roach made a commitment to work in the corner of UFC star Georges St-Pierre, who fought and defeated Michael Bisping on UFC 217, which took place in New York. Quigg won the fight via stoppage in round 6, in what was a one-sided beatdown. Quigg proved to be too much for Yefimovych and landed power shots to the head. During some exchanges, Yefimovych did well to counter some shots, however Quigg remained in control. In round 6, Yefimovych was taking too much punishment, appearing hurt, referee Luis Pabon called the fight off. The official time off stoppage was 50 seconds into the round. Quigg admitted he was a bit reckless in the opening round and said, "You cannot do that at a higher level. When I started relaxing, I felt miles better ... round four onwards, I don't think he wanted to know." After the fight WBA announced Quigg as their obligatory challenger.

Quigg vs. Valdez 
On 3 January 2018, ESPN first reported that a deal was close to being reached for Óscar Valdez (23–0, 19 KOs) to defend his WBO featherweight title against Quigg. The fight would take place on 10 March, with the venue likely to be the StubHub Center in Carson, California. On 13 January, the fight was finalised. Promoter Hearn also tweeted the confirmation. Valdez came in at 125.8 pounds at the weigh in for his fourth defence. Quigg however came in 3 pounds over at 128.8 pounds. He was not allowed to re-weigh. According to the California State Athletic Commission, if a fighter is 2 pounds or more over the contractual limit, he would not be allowed to lost the extra weight as he would have been 'dried out', any more weight loss could potentially be dangerous to his health. The CSAC fined Quigg 20% of his official purse of $100,000, with Valdez receiving half of the money from the fine. Quigg's purse was believed to be far more at around $500,000 plus British TV rights. Valdez was due his highest purse at $420,000, not including the additional $10,000 from Quigg's purse.

After a hard-fought 12 round battle with saw Valdez break Quigg's nose and in return Valdez have his own front teeth damaged, the final scorecards read 117–111, 117–111 and 118–110 in favour of the Valdez, thus retaining his WBO title. Quigg suffered a cut over his left eye in round 5 which caused him issues later in the fight whereas Valdez after having his mouth busted, was seen with blood pouring out in the second half of the fight. The difference in the fight was that Valdez had too much hand and foot speed for Quigg and was able unload on multiple punches on Quigg. Valdez's style of a higher punch output also caused him to take a lot of punishment throughout the fight. Valdez was hurt in round 5 from a big left hook from Quigg. In round 11, Valdez hurt Quigg with a hard head shot in the final 20 seconds. It was in round 11 that Quigg began to use his jab more to his own advantage. Valdez was then hurt by a low blow in that round. In round 12, Valdez tied Quigg up frequently and used movement to stay out of trouble. Quigg was humble in defeat stating the better man won, but felt it was closer. ESPN scored the fight for Valdez 115–113. They also reported that Quigg weighed 142.2 pounds compared to Valdez who was 135.6 pounds on fight night. CompuBox numbers showed that Valdez landed 238 of 914 punches thrown (26%), and Quigg landed 143 of his 595 thrown (24%). After the fight Quigg explained the reason he missed weight was because he had fractured his foot four weeks before the fight and unable to run to lose the extra pounds. The card was watched by an average 1.1 million viewers on ESPN.

Quigg vs. Briones 
On 20 August, Matchroom announced that Quigg would once again fight in the United States, this time at the TD Garden in Boston, Massachusetts on 20 October 2018 on the Billy Joe Saunders vs. Demetrius Andrade card. On 1 October,  Quigg's opponent was announced to be 32-year-old Mexican journeyman Mario Briones (29–7–2, 21 KOs) in a scheduled 8-round bout.  Quigg defeated Briones by a 2nd-round knockout. He hurt Briones with two hard right hands at the start of round 2. Quigg then landed flurries on Briones, whilst against the ropes, until referee Gene Del Bianco stepped in and stopped the contest. Briones was not happy about the fight being halted, as he was still on his feet, however gave the referee little choice for not engaging back. Quigg was hit with shots in both rounds as the fight proved to be competitive for how long it lasted.

Quigg vs. Carroll 
On 7 March 2020, Quigg faced Jono Carroll, who was ranked #8 by the IBF at super featherweight. Carroll outboxed, outlanded and dominated Quigg en route to an 11th-round TKO victory. Apart from a few good moments in the second round, Quigg was outclassed by Carroll throughout the whole fight, which prompted Quigg's corner to throw in the towel in round 11.

Professional boxing record

References

External links

Scott Quigg - Profile, News Archive & Current Rankings at Box.Live

English male boxers
World Boxing Association champions
1988 births
Living people
World super-bantamweight boxing champions
Featherweight boxers
Sportspeople from Bury, Greater Manchester
English Muay Thai practitioners
British Boxing Board of Control champions